The Open Source Order of the Golden Dawn (OSOGD) was an esoteric community of magical practitioners, many of whom came from pagan backgrounds. It was an initiatory teaching Order that drew upon the knowledge, experience, practices and spirit of the system of magical training and attainment developed by the original Hermetic Order of the Golden Dawn. The OSOGD ceased operating in September 2019.

History
The OSOGD was founded by Sam Webster in 2002 and based on the principles of the open-source software movement. The organization grew out of a series of workshops on ceremonial magic held by Webster in 2001.

According to Sam Webster,

According to The Manifesto of the Open Source Order of the Golden Dawn, the Order had undertaken to revise the teachings of the original Victorian era Hermetic Order of the Golden Dawn system to work more effectively in the 21st century. This redaction of the original rituals has taken on the aspect of a number of principles, listed in the Manifesto as Open Source Magick, New Aeon, Freedom of Information, Thelema, Duty, Universalism, and Form and Function.

In temple work, the OSOGD uses Egyptian, Enochian and Thelemic godforms in preference to the Judeo-Christian Archangels typical of the original Hermetic Order of the Golden Dawn. According to the Manifesto, OSOGD teaches "a progressively tiered system of spiritual development designed to invoke the Higher or Divine Genius latent in every human being."

Membership

To actually join the Order, a person must have had regular access to its Lodge, which was located in the San Francisco Bay Area. The Order did not conduct distance initiations, and required that all initiates attend initiation rituals in person.

Influences
The Open Source Order of the Golden Dawn drew heavily from Eastern sources, Thelema, Paganism, and the works of Aleister Crowley.

See also
 Open-source religion

Notes

References
 Crow, John. "Interview with Sam Webster of the Open Source Order of the Golden Dawn" on Thelema Coast to Coast #28: June 24, 2006.
 Gasperson, Tina (2006). New-time religion in NewsForge: The Online Newspaper for Linux and Open Source (May 17, 2006). Retrieved June 1, 2006.
 Keane, Sam. "Open to Revisions" Search Magazine, Volume 6, Issue 19, May–June, 2009. Retrieved July 27, 2009
 Krengel, Eric. Open Source Religion Explored Again -- Beyond the Western Traditions, January 16, 2007
 OSOGD (2002). The Manifesto of the Open Source Order of the Golden Dawn. Retrieved June 1, 2006.
 Wicker, Christine (2005). Not In Kansas Anymore - A Curious Tale of How Magic is Transforming America. Harper San Francisco.

External links
 

2002 establishments in the United States
Hermetic Order of the Golden Dawn
Magical organizations
Open content
Religious belief systems founded in the United States
Religious organizations established in 2002
Thelema
2019 disestablishments in the United States